MSP Solai Nadar Memorial Higher Secondary school is a higher secondary school located in Dindigul in the Indian state of Tamil Nadu.

The school was established in 1966 with 55 students. Within 5 years, it grew to 55 staff members and 1500 students. The school accommodates only boys and in 2013 enrolled 4200 students supported by 120 staff members.

The school is managed by the Dindigul Nadar Uravinmurai an association that also manages S.M.B.Mancikam Nadar Packiathammal Matriculation Higher Secondary School located nearby.

The main campus of around 6 acres is located on GTN Salai.

Management 

S. M. B. Manickam Nadar was the last Correspondent of the school and one of its founders in 1966. Following his retirement, Mr. S.Rathinapandian became the correspondent for the next 21 years. The school is currently headed by Correspondent P.Murugasen and K.Palpandi the Headmaster.

Graduate teachers &Curriculum / education 

The school follows Tamil Nadu State board medium of education and curriculum. The school has classes from 6th to 12th standard in both Tamil and English medium with 75% of students in the former and 25% in the latter.

B.T. ASSISTANT STAFF:-  ( MATHS )   

1.Mr.S.SahayaFrancis Xavier, M.Sc.,B.Ed.,   

2.Mr.T.Satheeshkumar, M.Sc.,B.Ed, 3.Ms.Pandiyammal,   M.Sc.,B.Ed, 

4.Mr.R.V.Ramalingam, B.Sc.,M.A.B.Ed, 

5.Ms.SugunaDevi.,M.Sc.,B.Ed, 

6.Ms.Poovilatha, M.Sc.,B.Ed, 

7.Mr.M.Balakumaran,  M.Sc.,B.Ed, 

8.Mr.P.Chandrasekaran, M.Sc.,B.Ed, 

9.Mr.R.Koolpandi B.Sc.,B.Ed,      

10.Mr.S.Kumar B.Sc.,M.A.B.Ed,         

11.Mr.Wasif Ahmed M.Sc.,B.Ed,  12.Ms.Barathi M.Sc.B.Ed., 13.Ms.Subarna,M.Sc.,B.Ed,

Head Master &Post Graduate Teachers 
Headmaster:-                                     K.PALPANDY, M.Sc.,M.Ed,M.phil.,                                    

Tamil:-                                                                1.Mr. P.Rajendran M.A.B.Ed.                        2.Mr. K.Rajendran.M.A.B.Ed.

English:-1.Mr. C.Karunakaran,  M.A.B.Ed.                 2.Ms.E.Catherine Thilagavathi,M.A.B.Ed.

Physics

1.Mr. S.Pandiarajan,M.Sc.,B.Ed.,   2.Miss.pratheepa M.Sc.,B.Ed

Chemistry:-  1.Mr.M.Kuruvaiya,M.Sc.M.Phil.,.B.Ed                       2.Mr.D.vijaya murugan,M.Sc.B.Ed                                                        

Mathematics:-  1.Mr. 1.Mr.S.Arumugam.M.Sc.B.Ed.,                                 2.Mr.R.RICHARD AROKIADOSS, M.Sc.B.Ed.,

Biology:-                                                          1.Mr. P.Manickasundaram,    M.Sc.M.Ed.,M.Phil., (Zoology).                                                        2.Mr. Balamurugan ,M.Sc.B.Ed.,(Botany),

Computer Science:-                                         1.Mr. Rajesh,                 2.Mr. Rajkumar

Arts and Science:-                                         1.Mr. P.Tamilselvan, M.A.B.Ed.,(HISTORY),                                   2.Mr. R.Raja,M.A.,B.Ed.,(ECONOMICS),                         3.Mr. A.Murugan,M.COM.,B.Ed.,(COMMERCE)                                     4.Mr.R.RAMESH M.Sc.B.Ed.,M.COM.,(COMMERCE)

Sports 

The school offers a wide array of sports and games, including football, athletics, basketball, cricket, handball, volleyball, ball badminton, shuttle badminton and field hockey. The annual basketball tournament hosted by MSP is a state-level event. In dindigul, MSP's football team holds the record for reaching the finals of Bharathiar Day sports during 2008/2009. None other team from dindigul has achieved such a feat. Following year they emerged as the bronze medal winners from the same tournament. The basketball team holds a special place in India with the team emerging victorious in almost every tournament they have participated. The handball team has won many state level matches.

Physical Education Staff:-

1.Mr. Murugavel,(PHYSICAL DIRECTOR) 2.Mr. Durairaj,  AHM                                            3.Mr. Raja.(P.E.T)

Cultural events 

The school holds an annual event in February, with dances, dramas and other cultural events. The flagship event of MSP's Annual day is "Oli Ozhi Uruvak Katchi" ("Light and Sound show" in English). The show is conducted by staging groups of students in the different parts of the school buildings and the lights are entirely switched off. Then one after another each group is lit by flashing lights in that spot alone.

Recent Activities 

The school has celebrating its Old student get to gather on 18 November 2018 please register all old students who can participate http://blissontechnologies.in/MSP-Alumniportal/

48th Annual Day 
On 25 January 2014 the school has celebrated its 47th Annual Day. Many cultural events were conducted. A short film named "Vetri nichayam" was shown.

References 

High schools and secondary schools in Tamil Nadu
Education in Dindigul district
Dindigul
Educational institutions established in 1966
1966 establishments in Madras State